Kent Hughes (born January 21, 1970) is a Canadian former ice hockey player and player agent, and the current general manager of the Montreal Canadiens of the National Hockey League (NHL).

Early life and career
A Montreal native, Hughes grew up in the West Island (Pierrefonds and Beaconsfield, Quebec) and played bantam AA hockey for the West Island Royals and midget AAA for the Lac St-Louis Lions. In 1987–88, he played for the Cégep de Saint-Laurent Patriotes, helping his team win the league championship. He later attended Middlebury College, where he was the captain of the hockey team for the 1991-92 season. Hughes earned a Juris Doctor degree from Boston College in 1996 before becoming a player agent.

Hughes became a player agent in 1998, when he began to represent first overall pick Vincent Lecavalier. In 2016, his agency MFIVE SPORT merged with Quartexx, and became one of the biggest agencies in the NHL, overseeing more than 290 million dollars worth of contracts. Hughes represented a multitude of NHL players including Patrice Bergeron, Kris Letang, Darnell Nurse, Sammy Blais, Alex Newhook, Colin White, Drake Batherson, Anthony Beauvillier, Marco Scandella, and Alexis Lafrenière.

Executive career
Hughes first became acquainted with hockey executive Jeff Gorton when both lived in Boston, with the latter working for the Boston Bruins. Gorton first attempted to recruit Hughes to work with him while he was general manager of the New York Rangers, but he declined. Gorton was later hired by Geoff Molson to be executive vice president of hockey operations for the Montreal Canadiens, after having sacked general manager Marc Bergevin after the team had a historically disastrous start to the 2021–22 NHL season, and began a search for a replacement. Hughes was persuaded to interview for the job, which he considered a "dream" position. His hiring as the eighteenth general manager in team history was announced on January 18, 2022.

While it was initially announced that coach Dominique Ducharme would be retained for the remainder of the season, but after the team had lost seven consecutive games at the beginning of 2022, most by blowout margins, Hughes removed Ducharme and replaced him with retired star forward Martin St. Louis. St. Louis had no professional coaching experience, but was immediately well-received. Beginning a plan to revamp the team's roster, Hughes executed a series of trades in his first two months, parting with players Tyler Toffoli, Ben Chiarot, Brett Kulak and Artturi Lehkonen to secure new draft picks and prospects. Following the season's end, Hughes announced the creation of the Canadiens' first in-house analytics department.

Hughes' first draft as general manager was consequential both in that Montreal was the host and the team, as a result of its last-place finish, was picking first overall for the first time since 1980. The Canadiens selected Slovak winger Juraj Slafkovský first overall, departing from the longstanding consensus that had favoured Canadian centre Shane Wright. On the day of the draft, Hughes also executed a series of trades to acquire former third overall pick Kirby Dach from the Chicago Blackhawks.

Personal life
Hughes' brother Ryan was a second round pick of the Quebec Nordiques in the 1990 NHL Entry Draft. Hughes' eldest son Riley was a seventh-round pick of the New York Rangers in the 2018 NHL Entry Draft. His youngest son Jack plays for Northeastern University and was a second-round pick of the Los Angeles Kings in the 2022 NHL Entry Draft.

References

Living people
Anglophone Quebec people
Ice hockey people from Quebec
National Hockey League general managers
Montreal Canadiens executives
1970 births